Sheikh Albadou (15 April 1988 – 1999), was a Thoroughbred racehorse and sire who was bred and trained in the United Kingdom. In a racing career which lasted from October 1990 until October 1992 he ran fifteen times and won six races. Sheikh Albadou won several major European sprint races including the Nunthorpe Stakes, the King's Stand Stakes and the Haydock Sprint Cup, but is best known for being the only European-trained winner of the Breeders' Cup Sprint. He was named European Champion Sprinter in 1991. At the end of his racing career Sheikh Albadou was retired to stud but made little impression as a sire of winners.

Background
Sheikh Albadou, a bay horse with a narrow white blaze was bred in England at the Highclere Stud, Berkshire. He was sired by Green Desert out of the Welsh Pageant mare Sanctuary. Green Desert finished second to Dancing Brave in the 2000 Guineas and became a leading sprinter, winning the July Cup. Apart from Sheikh Albadou, he sired the winners of over 1,000 races, including Desert Prince, Oasis Dream and Cape Cross, the sire of Sea the Stars. Sanctuary never raced but came from a good staying family, being a half sister to Little Wolf (Ascot Gold Cup) and Smuggler (Yorkshire Cup).

Sheikh Albadou was sent into training with Alex Scott at Newmarket, Suffolk.

Racing career

1990: two-year-old season
Sheikh Albadou made one start as a two-year-old, contesting a maiden race at Newmarket. He started slowly and made no impression in the race, finishing eighth of the eleven starters.

1991: three-year-old season
Sheikh Albadou won his first race on his 1991 reappearance, leading a furlong out and pulling clear to win a Pontefract maiden race "very easily" by seven lengths. He was narrowly beaten in a seven furlong handicap, but when brought back to sprint distances he won a valuable handicap at York by four lengths. In late June he was again tried over seven furlongs, finishing fourth in the Group Three Criterion Stakes at Newmarket, before being switched exclusively to sprinting.

In the Group One Nunthorpe Stakes Sheikh Albadou was made 6/1 third favourite behind the French-trained Divine Danse and the King's Stand Stakes winner Elbio. Pat Eddery tracked the two-year-old Paris House before taking the lead inside the final furlong and winning by one and a half lengths. Sheikh Albadou then took second place in two more Group one sprints, the Sprint Cup at Haydock, and the Prix de l'Abbaye at Longchamp, before being sent to Churchill Downs for the Breeders' Cup Sprint.

Breeders' Cup Sprint
Scott had prepared the Sheikh Albadou by training him on synthetic surfaces and had been convinced to run by the times the colt had recorded. Another point in his favour was that he was set to carry considerably less weight than he had been doing in Europe.
Although the British-trained Dayjur had narrowly failed to win the race in 1990 after jumping his shadow, European sprinters were not highly regarded, and Sheikh Albadou was given little chance against the Eclipse Award winner Housebuster, starting at odds of 26/1. Media Plan led the race and ran the opening quarter mile in 21 seconds, with Sheikh Albadou settled by Eddery in the middle of the field. Entering the straight, Housebuster challenged Media Plan for the lead, but Sheikh Albadou was traveling easily in fourth. Eddery sent the colt into the lead a furlong out and as Housebuster faded, having suffered an injury, Sheikh Albadou pulled away to win by an easy three lengths from the fast-finishing Pleasant Tap.

1992: four-year-old season
After his win in America, Sheikh Albadou was off the racecourse for seven months, finally returning at Royal Ascot for the King's Stand Stakes. Ridden by Walter Swinburn, He was held up in the early stages before quickening to lead a furlong out and winning in a tight finish from Mr Brooks and Elbio.

Sheikh Albadou was made favourite for the July Cup, in which he was matched against the season's other leading sprinter Shalford. Swinburn employed the same tactics as at Ascot, but Sheikh Albadou was overtaken in the closing stages and finished third, beaten a head and a neck by Mr Brooks and Pursuit of Love. In his next race he was tried over a mile, but finished only fourth in the Sussex Stakes behind Marling.

Sheikh Albadou returned to sprinting and a third meeting with Mr Brooks in the Haydock Sprint Cup. He produced what was probably his best performance in Europe, taking the lead a furlong out and pulling clear for an "impressive" two and a half length win.

Sheikh Albadou returned to America for his final two starts in October. At Belmont Park he finished three quarters of a length second to Rubiano in the Vosburgh Stakes before moving to Florida for the Breeders' Cup Sprint. Confidence in his challenge was reported to be high in what was to be his final race, although there was some discussion about the decision to run the colt on bute. He started at 3/1 but could never reach the lead, finishing fourth behind Thirty Slews.

Race record
.

Assessment

Sheikh Albadou remains the only European horse to win the Breeders' Cup Sprint: in fact no subsequent European runner has bettered the fourth place he achieved in 1992.

In the Cartier Racing Awards for 1991, Sheikh Albadou was named European Champion Sprinter.

Stud career

Sheikh Albadou was originally based as a stallion at the Gainsborough Stud at Versailles, Kentucky, but was later bought by the Emirates Park Stud. It was intended that he would be a shuttle stallion, standing at the Kirtlington Stud in Oxfordshire, before moving to Australia for the Southern Haemisphere breeding season. During his first season in England however, he suffered a heart attack while covering a mare and died in May 1999. His stud fee was £3,000 in his final season.

Sheikh Albadou was not a great success as a stallion, but he produced over 100 winners, the best known being the Stewards' Cup winner, Tayseer.

Pedigree

References

Breeders' Cup Sprint winners
Racehorses bred in the United Kingdom
Racehorses trained in the United Kingdom
Cartier Award winners
1988 racehorse births
1999 racehorse deaths
Thoroughbred family 19-c